{{DISPLAYTITLE:Tau2 Gruis}}

Tau2 Gruis (Tau2 Gruis), is a double star located in the constellation Grus. The somewhat faint double star can be located west of Beta Gruis. As of 2015, the pair had an angular separation of 0.60 arc seconds along a position angle of 176°. The system is 156 light years from Earth. The two stars were assigned the designation Tau2 due to their proximity to Tau3 Grus, by Louis de Lacaille in his Coelum Australe Stelliferum.

References

External links
https://web.archive.org/web/20120227032716/http://www.uranometriaargentina.com/

Double stars
Grus (constellation)
Grus, Tau2
216655
113191
Durchmusterung objects